Jauravia albidula, is a species of lady beetle endemic to Sri Lanka.

Description
Body length is about 2.8 to 3.0 mm. Body hemispherical. Body color pale yellowish brown. Eyes are black. Elytra margins are dark-brown. Metasternum and the first abdominal sternite are brownish. Head finely and sparsely punctured. Head clothed with golden, delicate and sparse pubescence. Pronotum deeply emarginate anteriorly with almost straight laterally. Pronotal punctation is fine, deep and sparse. Pronotal interspaces are coriaceous, and less bright. Pronotum clothed with golden, short, slightly erect pubescence. Elytral latera border with slightly raised at the humeral angle. Elytral punctation coarse, and shallow. Elytral interspaces are smooth and very shiny. Elytral pubescence is light golden. Ventrum with very fine and sparse punctures. Mesosternum, metasternum and abdominal sternites are coarse and clothed with golden, fine, short and sparse  pubescence.

References 

Coccinellidae
Insects of Sri Lanka
Beetles described in 1866